The Guglielmo Marconi International Fellowship Foundation, briefly called Marconi Foundation and currently known as The Marconi Society, was established by Gioia Marconi Braga in 1974 to commemorate the centennial of the birth (April 24, 1874) of her father Guglielmo Marconi. The Marconi International Fellowship Council was established to honor significant contributions in science and technology, awarding the Marconi Prize and an annual $100,000 grant to a living scientist who has made advances in communication technology that benefit mankind. Although Braga died in July 1996, the Marconi Society has continued to award the annual Marconi Prize and fellowship, which were first awarded in 1975. The Marconi Society also grants annual Marconi Society-Paul Baran Young Scholar Awards to young scientists who, by the time they turn 27, have made significant contributions in the fields of communication and information science. Originally, the Foundation was located at the Aspen Institute. In 1997, it relocated, by invitation, to Columbia University's Fu School of Engineering and Applied Science. The organization currently is headquartered in northeastern Ohio, outside of Cleveland.

Mission 
The Marconi Society is a public charity whose mission focuses on the intersection of Internet and Communications Technology (ICT) and digital inclusion advocacy. Its mission is to bring the organization's vision, expertise, and connections to support technology and digital inclusion innovators who are connecting the world. In addition to the two awards programs, the organization runs the Celestini Program, which pairs students in STEM fields with mentors and hands-on experiential learning opportunities, coordinates partnerships to improve broadband data mapping, and operates a yearly symposium and gala to celebrate that year's awardees and present the latest research and breakthroughs in ICT.

The Marconi Prize 
The Marconi Fellows are Sir Eric A. Ash (1984), Paul Baran (1991), Sir Tim Berners-Lee (2002), Claude Berrou (2005), Sergey Brin (2004), Francesco Carassa (1983), Vinton G. Cerf (1998), Andrew Chraplyvy (2009), Colin Cherry (1978), John Cioffi (2006), Arthur C. Clarke (1982), Martin Cooper (2013), Whitfield Diffie (2000), Federico Faggin (1988), James Flanagan (1992), David Forney, Jr. (1997), Robert G. Gallager (2003), Andrea Goldsmith (2020), Robert N. Hall (1989), Izuo Hayashi (1993), Martin Hellman (2000), Hiroshi Inose (1976), Irwin M. Jacobs (2011), Robert E. Kahn (1994) Sir Charles Kao (1985), James R. Killian (1975), Leonard Kleinrock (1986), Herwig Kogelnik (2001), Robert W. Lucky (1987), James L. Massey (1999), Robert Metcalfe (2003), Lawrence Page (2004), Yash Pal (1980), Seymour Papert (1981), Arogyaswami Paulraj (2014), David N. Payne (2008), John R. Pierce (1979), Ronald L. Rivest (2007), Arthur L. Schawlow (1977), Allan Snyder (2001), Robert Tkach (2009), Gottfried Ungerboeck (1996), Andrew Viterbi (1990), Jack Keil Wolf (2011), Jacob Ziv (1995). In 2015, the prize went to Peter T. Kirstein for bringing the internet to Europe.

The first woman to win the award was Andrea Goldsmith in 2020.

The Paul Baran Young Scholar Award 
Since 2008, the Marconi Society has also issued the Paul Baran Young Scholar Awards, which celebrate young leaders in advanced communications technology. Recipients are Himanshu Asnani (2014 or 2015), Salman Abdul Baset (2008), Aleksandr Biberman (2010), Salvatore Campione (2013), Keun Yeong Cho (2012), Aakanksha Chowdhery (2012), Guilhem de Valicourt (2012), Felix Gutierrez (2009), Joseph Kakande (2011), Bill Ping Piu Kuo (2011), Rafael Laufer (2008), Domanic Lavery (2013), Joseph Lukens (2015), Diomidis Michalopoulos (2010), Marco Papaleo (2009), Ken Pesyna (2015), Eric Plum (2009), Yuan Shen (2010), Kiseok Song (2014), Sebastien Soudan (2009), Jay Kumar Sundararajan (2008), Kartik Venkat (2015), Eitan Yaakobi (2009), Ke Wang (2013), Yihong Wu (2011), and Hao Zou (2008), Joe Lukens (2015), Kiseok Song (2014), Alexsandr Biberman (2010), Piotr Roztocki (2020), Vikram Iyer (2020).

References

External links
The Marconi Society website

Educational foundations in the United States
Organizations established in 1974